The Dartmouth Big Green men's ice hockey team is a National Collegiate Athletic Association (NCAA) Division I college ice hockey program that represents Dartmouth College. The Big Green are a member of ECAC Hockey. They play at the Thompson Arena in Hanover, New Hampshire.

History

Early years
Dartmouth College fielded their first ice hockey team in January 1906, winning their first game 4–3. The team played an expanded schedule the next two years but after a 1–5–1 finish in 1908 the program hired its first head coach and promptly posted a 10–3–1 record. The ice hockey club would bring in a new bench boss each year until 1912 when Fred Rocque stayed for three seasons followed by Clarence Wanamaker with four. Dartmouth was able to win more than they lost during this time despite the coaching turnover and the lack of local facilities. The team played precious few games at home, hosting a total of 16 over 13 seasons. In 1918 the university decided to suspend the program as a result of the ongoing first World War but returned in January 1920 and had continued unabated ever since. The same year the team increased its number of home games by beginning to play on Occom Pond but despite this Wanamaker would leave after the year and the coaching carousel began anew with three more coaches over 6 years. J. Philip Bower settled the program with his 7-year stint and while the first on-campus rink was built in 1929 the team started losing and Bower was out after 1933. After 4 years of Herbert Gill the Indians were able to finally find their man in Eddie Jeremiah.

Jeremiah Years
Jeremiah, a three-time letterman for the Indians, got his career started with a bang, producing an 18–4 mark in his first year, breaking the team record for wins and post the second-best winning percentage. The team would continue to play well under their new coach, earning winning records each year until they dominated the college hockey landscape in 1941–42, going 21–2, setting a host of team records and being named as the national collegiate champion. Jeremiah would leave after the championship to serve in the military for the duration of World War II but the team continued to play well in his absence. Dartmouth was one of the few programs that played through the duration of the war and over the next three seasons the team did not lose a single game. Utilizing three coaches (two of them serving jointly) the program went 26–0–1 and sported future Hall of Fame members Dick Rondeau, Charlie Holt and Bill Riley. Jeremiah returned for the team's 1945–46 season and did not appear to have missed a step, posting two tremendous years before the first NCAA tournament was announced for 1948. The Indians continued to trounce their competition, going 20–2 during the season and with the best record in the nation they were the first team selected from the east. With Riley brothers Bill and Joe leading the attack Dartmouth rolled over tournament host Colorado College 8–4 and met Michigan in the final. The Wolverines took a one-goal lead twice in the opening frame but the Indians were able to match them both times. The roles reversed in the second period with Dartmouth briefly pulling ahead but entering the final period the score was tied 4–4. The Indians faltered in the third, allowing 4 Michigan goals and lost the game 8–4. Despite the disappointment Joe Riley was named the most outstanding player in the tournament

The next season Bill Riley led the nation in scoring, posting 41 assists and 78 points, setting season- and career-best marks for Dartmouth while his brother tied the team record for goals in one season with 45. Dartmouth slipped a bit in the standings, finishing 16–5 during the season but they returned to the tournament along with the same three teams from the year before. The Indians were given a change to avenge their loss from the year before and took advantage by dropping the powerhouse Wolverines 4–2 and reached their second championship game. Over the course of the season Boston College had lost only one game and that was to Dartmouth. The Indians played the Eagles close, taking a 2–1 lead into the second period after Bill Riley scored with less than a minute remaining in the first. BC responded with two quick goals in the second and the held the Indians off the board until the third. Shortly after Alan Kerivan tied the game the Eagles got their fourth goals of the night and held on to win the game. Once again, despite losing the championship, a Dartmouth player was named as tournament MOP, this time the award went to Dick Desmond, another future member of the US hockey hall of fame as well as a silver medalist at the 1952 Winter Olympics.

After two consecutive runs in the NCAA tournament Dartmouth sharply declined. The team spent the next decade posting middling-to-bad records but this did not prevent Jeremiah from receiving the first Spencer Penrose Award in 1951. The Indians posted a good record in 1959, going 17–8 but were edged out for the NCAA tournament by teams with better records. The following year Dartmouth had the best winning percentage of any eastern team (.725) and were one of four eastern teams selected for two play-in games (the only time this happened in NCAA tournament history) where they lost to Boston University and them promptly declined in the succeeding years.

Two years later Dartmouth was one of 28 teams that founded ECAC Hockey but the change did little to improve their fortunes. Jeremiah took the 1964 season off and his assistant Abner Oakes took over, leading the team to a 14–7 record, good enough for 6th in the conference but were snubbed by the ECAC selection committee and left out of the 8-team tournament. Once Jeremiah returned and the weakest dozen teams were removed from the conference, Dartmouth posted another good record, finishing 14–9 and this time they were invited to the ECAC tournament but lost to eventual champion BC in the quarterfinals. Over the next two seasons the Indians won only 9 games but Jeremiah was award the Spencer Penrose Award for the second time in 1967. After that year Jeremiah resigned as head coach due to ill health and then died from cancer three months later.

Return to the NCAA Tournament
Oakes coached the team for three years after Jeremiah's departure before turning the program over to Grant Standbrook. The Indians were able to produce three good years under Standbrook and made their second ECAC tournament in 1974 but again could not get out of the quarterfinals. That year the university changed the team nickname to the Big Green after several years of pressure to move away from their unofficial 'Indians' moniker. Standbrook would coach one more season, ending on a sour note, before Dartmouth moved on to George Crowe. The Big Green opened the season with their new head coach in a new home building, the Rupert C. Thompson Arena. In their new digs the Big Green improved markedly, rising to 16 wins in Crow's first year and returned to the ECAC tournament. After two modest seasons, one in which the team began sponsoring a holiday tournament, the Auld Lang Syne Classic, Dartmouth rose to 4th in the conference and won 19 games for the first time since 1948 and made their first ECAC championship game. Though the team lost the conference title tilt they were given the second eastern seed and returned to the tournament for the first time in 30 years. Dartmouth opened against the WCHA champion North Dakota and lost a close game to the western champion 4–2 ben then redeemed themselves slightly with a consolation game victory. The following year the ECAC split their conference into three divisions and Dartmouth became the first Ivy Region champion. The Big Green rode their division title back to the ECAC title match, losing to fellow Ivy team Cornell and getting the second eastern seed for the second consecutive year. Dartmouth found themselves in a rematch with the Fighting Sioux but the results were much the same with North Dakota winning 4–1. Once more Crowe's team won the consolation match to at least get something out of their tournament appearance but after 1980 the Big Green slid down the standings.

Decline to the bottom
Crowe coached Dartmouth for four more years and could not post a winning record. Brian Mason was brought in 1984, fresh off of two fantastic years with Division II RIT, but he could not replicate his success at the Division I level. In six seasons Mason's teams topped out at 10 wins and finished with losing records every year. They never finished better than 9th in the 12-team conference (after several former members left in 1984 to form Hockey East) and consequently never made an appearance in the ECAC tournament. Mason was fired in 1990 and his assistant Jeff Kosak was hired but after 10 days he resigned, citing 'personal and family reasons'. Dartmouth was eventually able to get Ben Smith to serve as head coach for the 1990–91 season but after posting a program-worst 1–24–3 record he left to take over at Northeastern. Smith's replacement, Roger Demment, was able to improve the team's record but not by much. Over the next six seasons Dartmouth remained below .500 but was able to make the ECAC tournament twice, through they lost both games they played.

Gaudet Years
In 1997 Dartmouth hired Bob Gaudet away from Brown, giving the program the first Dartmouth alumnus to helm the team since Oakes in 1970. The first three years under the new bench boss were much of the same but in Gaudet's fourth season the Big Green finally posted a winning season and won an ECAC tournament game both for the first time since 1980, ending a 21-year period of futility. The Big Green would record winning seasons over seven straight campaigns, twice winning 20 games (for the first time since 1948) and shared the ECAC regular season title in 2005–06, their first conference title in team history. Despite the championship Dartmouth was left out of the NCAA tournament after losing to Harvard in the ECAC semifinal with a 10–1 debacle. Dartmouth continued to play well under Gaudet who became the team's all-time leader in victories in 2018, but the Big Green did not win a conference semifinal game during his tenure nor made an NCAA tournament appearance since 1980.

Reid Cashman
On April 24, 2020, Bob Gaudet announced his retirement. His replacement, Reid Cashman, was named Big Green coach on June 1, 2020. Jason Tapp was added as new Associate Head Coach on June 23, and assistant coach Stavros Paskaris was added to the staff on July 6. Paskaris' stay was brief, as he left for Bowling Green in May, 2021. Troy Thibodeau joined the Big Green coaching staff from the USHL's Tri City Storm in June, 2021.

Championships
The team won the ECAC regular season crown in 2006 and the Ivy League title 15 times (1934, 1943, 1943, 1944, 1945, 1946, 1957, 1948, 1949, 1959, 1960, 1964, 1979, 1980 & 2007).

Season-by-season results

Source:

Coaches

Olympians
This is a list of Dartmouth alumni who have played on an Olympic team.

† denotes the AHA team that played in the Olympics but was disqualified from medal contention.‡ denoted the AAU team that marched in the opening ceremony but did not participate.

Statistical leaders
Source:

Career points leaders

Career goaltending leaders

GP = Games played; Min = Minutes played; W = Wins; L = Losses; T = Ties; GA = Goals against; SO = Shutouts; SV% = Save percentage; GAA = Goals against average

Minimum 35 games

Statistics current through the start of the 2018–19 season.

Players and personnel

Current roster
As of September 20, 2022.

Awards and honors

United States Hockey Hall of Fame
Source:

Myles Lane (1973)
Eddie Jeremiah (1973)
Doug Everett (1974)
Bill Riley (1977)
Jack Riley (1979)
Walter Bush (1980)
Dick Rondeau (1985)
Dick Desmond (1988)
Charlie Holt (1997)
Bruce Mather (1998)
Joe Riley (2002)

NCAA

Individual awards

Spencer Penrose Award
Eddie Jeremiah: 1951, 1967

Derek Hines Unsung Hero Award
Dan Shribman, F: 2007

NCAA Division I Ice Hockey Scoring Champion
Bill Riley, LW: 1949

Tournament Most Outstanding Player
 Joe Riley, F; 1948
 Dick Desmond, G; 1949

All-Americans
First Team

1947-48: Bill Riley, F
1948-49: Dick Desmond, G; Bill Riley, F; Joe Riley, F
1949-50: Arnold Oss, F
1950-51: Clifford Harrison, F
1951-52: John Grocott, D
1959-60: Tom Wahman, G; Rusty Ingersoll, F
1979-80: Ross Brownridge, F
2003-04: Lee Stempniak, F
2006-07: David Jones, F

Second Team

1947-48: George Pulliam, D
1988-89: Dave Williams, D
2004-05: Lee Stempniak, F
2005-06: Mike Ouellette, F

ECAC Hockey

Individual awards

ECAC Hockey Rookie of the Year
 Hugh Jessiman, RW; 2003
 Jody O'Neill, G; 2009

Tim Taylor Award
 Roger Demment, 1993
 Bob Gaudet, 2006

ECAC Hockey Best Defensive Forward
 Mike Ouellette, C; 2006

All-Conference
First Team All-ECAC Hockey

 1979–80: Ross Brownridge, F
 1988–89: Dave Williams, D
 2001–02: Mike Maturo, F
 2003–04: Grant Lewis, D; Lee Stempniak, F
 2004–05: Lee Stempniak, F
 2005–06: Mike Ouellette, F
 2006–07: David Jones, F
 2007–08: Nick Johnson, F

Second Team All-ECAC Hockey

 1961–62: Dave Leighton, F
 1964–65: Dean Matthews, F
 1973–74: Tom Fleming, F
 1987–88: Steve Laurin, F
 1992–93: Scott Fraser, F
 2000–01: Trevor Byrne, D
 2001–02: Trevor Byrne, D
 2002–03: Trevor Byrne, D
 2003–04: Hugh Jessiman, F
 2005–06: Grant Lewis, D; David Jones, F
 2010–11: James Mello, G
 2012–13: Mike Keenan, D
 2014–15: Eric Neiley, F

Third Team All-ECAC Hockey

 2006–07: Ben Lovejoy, D
 2007–08: Evan Stephens, D
 2009–10: Evan Stephens, D
 2010–11: Joe Stejskal, D
 2016–17: Troy Crema, F
 2021–22: Clay Stevenson, G

ECAC Hockey All-Rookie Team

 1990–91: Mike Bracco, G; Tony DelCarmine, F; Scott Fraser, F
 1991–92: Pat Turcotte, F
 1992–93: Bill Kelleher, F
 1994–95: David Whitworth, F
 1998–99: Jamie Herrington, F
 1999–00: Trevor Byrne, D
 2001–02: Lee Stempniak, F
 2002–03: Sean Offers, D; Hugh Jessiman, F
 2003–04: Grant Lewis, D
 2004–05: Nick Johnson, F
 2006–07: TJ Galiardi, F
 2007–08: Evan Stephens, D
 2008–09: Jody O'Neill, G; Doug Jones, F
 2021–22: Clay Stevenson, G
 2022–23: Cooper Black, G

Ivy League

Ivy League Player of the Year
 Ross Brownridge, F; 1980
 Mike Ouellette, D; 2006
 David Jones, RW; 2007
 Drew O'Connor, F; 2020

Ivy league Rookie of the Year
 Hugh Jessiman, F; 2003

Big Green players in the NHL
As of July 1, 2022.

Other notable players

See: :Category:Dartmouth Big Green men's ice hockey players

See also
Dartmouth Big Green women's ice hockey
New Hampshire–Dartmouth rivalry

References

External links
 

 
Ice hockey teams in New Hampshire